Njan Ninnodu Koodeyundu is a 2015 Indian Malayalam-language film directed by Priyanandanan, starring Siddharth Bharathan and Vinay Forrt. The film won the John Abraham Award for Best Malayalam Film in 2014.

Plot
Njan Ninnodu Koodeyundu is the story of Damanan and Madanan, who are petty thieves and one day their plan goes downhill and the duo jumps into a river to escape and they lose consciousness. Both see a dream....

Cast

Siddharth Bharathan
Vinay Forrt
Aparna Vinod
Navami Murali
Jaise Jose
Madhupal
Antony Mathai

Reception 
The Times of India gave the movie 2.5 stars, stating that "Replete with performances that also feel functional at many junctures, the movie is a tad too contrived for the average audience." NowRunning was also mixed in their review, as they praised the performances by the lead actors while also writing "But there is indeed an air of artificiality that is very much there, and at times it makes the proceedings appear a bit too synthetic. The film isn't able to sustain its momentum as well in the latter half, and it all winds up in a hurry, as the two men are shaken out of the reverie that they have been caught in."

References

External links
 

2015 films
2010s Malayalam-language films
Films directed by Priyanandanan